MedStar Washington Hospital Center is the largest private hospital in Washington, D.C. A member of MedStar Health, the not-for-profit Hospital Center is licensed for 926 beds. Health services in primary, secondary and tertiary care are offered to adult and neonatal patients. It also serves as a teaching hospital for Georgetown University School of Medicine.

The Hospital Center occupies a  campus in Northwest Washington that it shares with three other medical facilities. Immediately adjacent to MedStar Washington Hospital Center are the National Rehabilitation Hospital and the central branch of Children's National Medical Center.

History 
The MedStar Washington Hospital Center was founded on March 10, 1958, when three specialty hospitals, Central Dispensary and Emergency Center, Episcopal Eye, Ear and Throat Hospital, and Garfield Hospital, merged into one. On May 7, 1998, Medlantic Healthcare Group, the Hospital Center's not-for-profit parent company, merged with Helix Health, a group of four Baltimore, MD-based hospitals, making the combined company the largest health care provider in the mid-Atlantic region. Helix/Medlantic was renamed MedStar Health on February 1, 1999.

Overview 
The Washington Hospital Center Heart program is a national leader in the research, diagnosis, and treatment of cardiovascular disease; its angioplasty or cardiac catheterization has the largest volume of PCI cases in the nation within the University HealthSystem Consortium (UHC). One of the Washington area's first heart transplants was done at the Hospital Center on May 22, 1987. Washington Hospital Center is home to Washington's only 256-slice Cardiac CT scanner and has the only onsite 24/7 cardiac catheterization team in the region. Its Ventricular Assist Device program is certified by The Joint Commission.  Recently, the MedStar Heart Institute at Washington Hospital Center has forged an alliance with the Cleveland Clinic Sydell and Arnold Miller Family Heart & Vascular Institute.

In addition to its cardiac care specialties, the Hospital Center is respected as a top facility in other areas including cancer, neurosciences, gastrointestinal disorders, endocrinology, women's services, transplantation and burn.  MedStar Washington Hospital Center's neurosciences program offers the full range of surgical and minimally invasive treatment and operates the first JCAHO-accredited Primary Stroke Center in the District.  The Hospital Center is home to the region's adult burn center.

The Washington Cancer Institute (WCI) is the District's largest cancer care provider, treating more cancer patients than any other program in the nation's capital. The Cancer Institute diagnosed more than 2,494 new cases during fiscal year 2008. There were more than 76,464 outpatient visits and more than 2,352 inpatient admissions during that period. WCI provides comprehensive, interdisciplinary care including surgical, radiation, robotic and medical oncology services as well as counseling for patients and families, cancer education, community outreach program and clinical research trials. The Cancer Institute is home to the area's only Gamma Knife and also has the Trilogy Linear Accelerator.

The Hospital Center's transplantation program ranks among the top five percent in the nation for patient outcomes and consistently exceeds the national average. The program for kidney, pancreas and heart is one of the busiest in the mid-Atlantic region.

Perhaps the Hospital Center's most wide-reaching presence is its MedSTAR Transport air ambulance service, which, as of 2008 had carried nearly 50,000 patients since its inception in 1983. The American College of Surgeons consistently recognizes the MedSTAR Trauma program as one of the nation's best Level I shock/trauma units.

Statistics 
In fiscal year 2011, 40,192 inpatients were served—including 4,079 births—and 411,514 outpatients. The Hospital Center has a medical/dental staff of 1,407. There were nearly 25,000 cardiac catheterization procedures performed during FY 2012. There were 1,670 open-heart surgeries and ten heart transplants performed during the fiscal year 2011.

There were 108 kidney transplants, four combination kidney/pancreas transplants and no pancreas transplant performed during fiscal year 2011.  There were 2,157 helicopter transports and 705 trauma unit visits in FY 2011. There were 87,114 Emergency Department visits. Washington Hospital Center provided over $22 million in charity care during FY 2011.

Rankings 
In 2012–13, the MedStar Washington Hospital Center was named among “America’s Best Hospitals” for Cardiology & Heart Surgery by U.S. News & World Report in the magazine's 22nd annual survey of nearly 5,000 health care facilities.

Washington Hospital Center was the only D.C. hospital to be ranked in the areas of cardiology and heart surgery in 2012/13 by U.S. News & World Report.  Only 148 medical centers in the U.S. were ranked in one or more of 16 specialties designated in U.S. News & World Reports survey. The Washington, D.C., metropolitan area, of which the Washington Hospital Center is a part, includes Alexandria and Arlington County, Virginia, and Bethesda and Rockville, Maryland. There are 59 hospitals in this area, and of these, the Washington Hospital Center is ranked number two, just below Inova Fairfax Hospital.

ER One 

ER One is a prototype hospital envisioned for the Washington, D.C., area.  The hospital is an all-scenarios facility, designed to handle, for example, a huge influx of contaminated patients from a terrorist attack.  The emergency department can accommodate 220 patients in 24 hours, a figure that can easily double in emergency situations.  ER One is capable of managing chemical, biological, explosive, and radiological catastrophes.

Additionally, ER One is a research facility, not just for doing research in the traditional hospital research sense, but as a prototype hospital, in order to research the very design of hospitals.

Design elements include mass decontamination, surge capacity, and preparedness for other emergencies such as an outbreak of bird flu.  The emergency department (ED) has added a lab located in the ED to expedite blood tests, ten large examination rooms that will hold three patients each, negative pressure capability to prevent potentially contagious air from escaping an examination room, and sterilization using vaporized hydrogen peroxide.

AMALGA 

The Washington Hospital Center's homegrown Azyxxi healthcare software was purchased by Microsoft in July 2006.

References

External links 
 
 MedStar Health
 Organ Procurement and Transplantation Network

Teaching hospitals in Washington, D.C.
Hospital buildings completed in 1958
Hospitals established in 1958
1958 establishments in Washington, D.C.
Georgetown University Medical Center
Trauma centers